is a former Japanese football player.

Playing career
Morisaki was born in Tokyo on April 20, 1976. After graduating from high school, he joined JEF United Ichihara in 1995. On June 1, 1996, he debuted as forward against Avispa Fukuoka in J.League Cup. However he could only play this match and he moved to Japan Football League club Mito HollyHock in 1997. In September 1997, he moved to Regional Leagues club Yokogawa Electric. The club was promoted to Japan Football League from 1999. He retired end of 1999 season.

Club statistics

References

External links

1976 births
Living people
Association football people from Tokyo
Japanese footballers
J1 League players
Japan Football League (1992–1998) players
Japan Football League players
JEF United Chiba players
Mito HollyHock players
Tokyo Musashino United FC players
Association football forwards